Yaohua Road is an interchange station between Line 7 and Line 8 of the Shanghai Metro. It is located in the Shanghai Expo 2010 zone.

The station was closed temporarily between 22 January and 31 January 2008, for the construction of the South Xizang Road tunnel, which runs parallel underneath the subway line. On 24 October 2010 the station handled 311,000 entries and exits.

The station served as the southern terminus of Line 8 from 29 December 2007 until 5 July 2009, when the line's southern extension to the current terminus at Shendu Highway opened.

Station Layout

References 

Railway stations in Shanghai
Line 7, Shanghai Metro
Line 8, Shanghai Metro
Shanghai Metro stations in Pudong
Railway stations in China opened in 2007